Deniz Orhun (born 1974)  is a chef,  media personality and businesswoman.

Chef Deniz graduated from Ankara University-Department of Agriculture Engineering, she completed her MBA Master's degree at London College and Hacettepe University.

She worked at Merck Sharp & Dohme, at Novartis and at Tetra Pak for various missions in Sweden, Dubai and Brazil.

She then went to the US and studied Baking and Pastry at Kendall College which is known as the “Harvard of the culinary world”. She worked at Swedish Bakery, Union League and Four Seasons Chicago. She represented Turkey during the International Cuisine Festival and won a first prize.

Chef Deniz is owner and founder of Klemantin since 2008, she has gained success through a variety of business ventures.

Television shows

Awards
2007:Best Chef / International Cuisine Festival

Personal life
Deniz Orhun is married. She speaks Turkish and English.

References

External links
 Official website
 Deniz Orhun - Radikal Newspaper
 Pastane - TRT 1 Official Site
 Ramazan Sofrası - TRT 
 Deniz'den Mutfak Hikayeleri - Cine 5 Official Site
 Deniz Orhun - Great Chefs Channel
 Daily News - Turkish Chef Represents Turkey in China

1974 births
Date of birth missing (living people)
Turkish television chefs
Turkish women in business
Businesspeople from Istanbul
Turkish television personalities
Living people
People from Ankara
Turkish women television presenters